Hovgaard can refer to:

People
Andreas Hovgaard (1853-1910), Danish Arctic explorer
William Hovgaard (1857-1950), Danish American naval design expert
Hans Hovgaard (1895-1980), Danish gymnast

Places
Hovgaard Island (Greenland)
Hovgaard Island, Antarctica
Hovgaard Island (Kara Sea) (Ostrov Khovgarda), Nordenskiöld Archipelago, Russia
Hovgaard Islands, Nunavut, Canada